David Scott McNiven (born 9 September 1955) is a Scottish former professional footballer who played as a forward.

Club career
Born in Stonehouse, McNiven played for Leeds United, Bradford City, Blackpool, Pittsburgh Spirit, Halifax Town and Morecambe.

McNiven signed for Bradford City in February 1978 from Leeds, leaving in February 1983 to join Blackpool. He scored 66 goals in 245 appearances for the club in all competitions - 64 goals in 212 league appearances, 2 goals in 11 FA Cup appearances, and no goals in 22 FL Trophy appearances.

He made his debut for Blackpool in 1983, scoring the only goal in a victory over Rochdale at home. He started every subsequent game in the 1982–83 campaign, scoring four more goals as the club finished fourth-bottom of Division 4 and had to seek re-election. The following season saw McNiven make 32 League appearances and score six goals. He also scored one of the two goals that put Blackpool into the Fourth Round of the FA Cup at the expense of Manchester City.

International career
He earned three caps for the Scotland under-21 team.

Family
His sons David and Scott are both footballers as well, while his uncle Tom was a coach.

Sources

References

1955 births
Living people
Scottish footballers
Leeds United F.C. players
Bradford City A.F.C. players
Blackpool F.C. players
Pittsburgh Spirit players
Halifax Town A.F.C. players
Morecambe F.C. players
English Football League players
Association football forwards
Scotland under-21 international footballers
Scottish expatriate footballers
Scottish expatriate sportspeople in the United States
Expatriate soccer players in the United States